Arin King (born 8 February 1991) is a Canadian-born Trinidad and Tobago footballer who plays as a defender. She has been a member of the Trinidad and Tobago women's national team.

International goals
Scores and results list Trinidad and Tobago' goal tally first.

References

External links 
 

1991 births
Living people
Citizens of Trinidad and Tobago through descent
Trinidad and Tobago women's footballers
Women's association football defenders
Women's association football forwards
FC Neunkirch players
Trinidad and Tobago women's international footballers
Pan American Games competitors for Trinidad and Tobago
Footballers at the 2011 Pan American Games
Footballers at the 2015 Pan American Games
Competitors at the 2018 Central American and Caribbean Games
Trinidad and Tobago expatriate women's footballers
Trinidad and Tobago expatriate sportspeople in Switzerland
Expatriate women's footballers in Switzerland
Trinidad and Tobago people of Canadian descent
Canadian women's soccer players
Soccer players from Toronto
Sportspeople from Scarborough, Toronto
People from Pickering, Ontario
Canadian sportspeople of Trinidad and Tobago descent
Toronto Varsity Blues soccer players
Centennial College alumni
Canadian expatriate soccer players
Canadian expatriate sportspeople in Switzerland